Jan Carlsson (10 October 1930 – 16 January 1979) was a Swedish sprinter who won the national titles in the 100 m in 1954 and in the 200 m in 1953–55. He placed fifth in these events at the 1954 European Athletics Championships, and held a Swedish record over 400 m.

References

Swedish male sprinters
1930 births
1979 deaths
Athletes from Gothenburg
20th-century Swedish people